Miguel Alemán Valdés (29 September 1900 – 14 May 1983) was a Mexican politician who served a full term as the President of Mexico from 1946 to 1952, the first civilian president after a string of revolutionary generals. 

His administration was characterized by Mexico's rapid industrialization, often called the Mexican Miracle, but also for a high level of personal enrichment for himself and his associates.  His presidency was the first of a new generation of Mexican leaders, who had not directly participated in the Mexican Revolution, and many in his cabinet were also young, university-educated civilians, close friends from his days at university.

Early life and career

Alemán was born in Sayula in the state of Veracruz, the son of revolutionary Gen. Miguel Alemán González and Tomasa Valdés Ledezma. Both had been married before, with Alemán González having a son by his first wife.  They had two sons together, Carlos and Miguel. The family lived in straitened circumstances, with Miguel remembering when he was young that when huaraches hurt his feet, he would urinate on them to soften the leather. His father, Miguel Alemán González, began fighting before the outbreak of the Mexican Revolution, a so-called "precursor" in a region of Veracruz state. He avidly read the tracts of Ricardo Flores Magón, of the Mexican Liberal Party and opposed the repressive regime of Porfirio Díaz. Alemán González left his family with his parents to fight with Cándido Aguilar, the son-in-law of Venustiano Carranza against the Díaz regime. In 1920 the family moved to Mexico City, but with the accession to power of the Sonoran generals Adolfo de la Huerta, Álvaro Obregón, and Plutarco Elías Calles, Alemán González continued in opposition to the government. He was implicated in the murder of one of Obregón's commanders, Arnulfo R. Gómez, and was on the run. The general met his end in March 1929 in a hail of bullets, probably committing suicide.

Young Miguel had experienced first-hand the disruption of the impacts of the continuing violence in Mexico. Alemán's schooling was sporadic in his early years, because of needing to move frequently; he attended schools in Acayucan, Coatzacoalcos, and Orizaba. For a time, he worked at the British-owned Mexican Eagle Petroleum Company, where he first learned English and became fluent in it.

He recalled his father advised him of "the usefulness of returning to my studies and choosing an occupation more stable than the military." Alemán did that, attending the National Preparatory School in Mexico City from 1920 to 1925, founding the newspaper Eureka. He then went to the School of Law at the National University (UNAM) until 1928, completing his law degree with his thesis on occupational diseases and accidents among workers. At UNAM, he was the leader of a group of classmates, all of whom went on the prominence in Mexican life. They included Angel Carvajal; Manuel Sánchez Cuen, who served as subdirector of PEMEX in the Alemán administration; Héctor Pérez Martínez; Andrés Serra Rojas; Manuel Ramírez Vázquez; Luis Garrido Díaz, who became rector of UNAM during Alemán's presidency; Antonio Carrillo Flores, who was director of the Fondo de Cultura Económica; and Alfonso Noriega, head of the Confederación de Cámaras Industriales.

As a successful attorney, his first practice was in representing miners suffering from silicosis. He won two notable legal victories in representing workers against corporations—the first was in securing compensation for dependents of railroad workers who were killed in revolutionary battles, the second was to gain indemnities for miners injured at work. These victories gained him considerable favor with Mexico's labor unions.

Political career

First positions

Alemán started public service with a relatively minor appointment as legal adviser to the Secretary of Agriculture and Livestock (1928–30). Other positions followed, including the Federal Board of Conciliation and Arbitration in 1930. In 1933, he served as the President of the Unifying Committee for Plutarco Elías Calles, which brought him into prominence. He then served as a Senator from his home state of Veracruz 1934–36, representing the Party of the Mexican Revolution (an earlier name of the party later known as the PRI).  When governor-elect Manlio Favio Altamirano was assassinated, Alemán accepted appointment as governor from 1936 to 1939. The appointment can be seen as a political reward from the Cárdenas administration for helping oust Plutarco Elías Calles during the intra-party struggle. From 1940 to 1945, he served as Secretary of the Interior (Gobernación) under Manuel Ávila Camacho after directing Ávila's national presidential campaign. As Secretary of the Interior during World War II, he dealt with Axis espionage and Sinarquistas, whom some consider Mexican fascists.

Election of 1946

President Avila Camacho chose Alemán as the official candidate of the party in 1945, running for president in 1946.  There were many possibilities for the president to choose among, both civilian and military, including Avila Camacho's older brother, Maximino Ávila Camacho. The Avila Camacho brothers shared ill health, and Maximino died in February 1945, following a banquet. His death averted a possible political crisis of succession. "There were some who wondered whether something more than seasoning had been added to Maximino's food" the day he died. Among the civilians were Javier Rojo Gómez, the head of government of the Federal District; Marte R. Gómez, Secretary of Agriculture; Dr. Gustavo Baz, secretary of Health; and Ezequiel Padilla, Secretary of Foreign Relations, and Alemán, who headed the most powerful ministry. Military men were also strong contenders, and all previous post-revolutionary presidents had participated in the Mexican Revolution.  Miguel Henriquez Guzmán, Enrique Calderón, Jesús Agustín Castro, and Francisco Castillo Nájera were in consideration.  Alemán received the backing of the Confederation of Mexican Workers (CTM). Avila Camacho paved the way with the military for Mexico's first civilian president in the modern era. Prior to the summer election, the Partido de la Revolución Mexicana became the Institutional Revolutionary Party.

He followed the pattern established by Lázaro Cárdenas's campaign in 1934, so that Alemán campaigned in all parts of the country, a means by which the candidate sees all areas of the republic and voters make contact with the candidate. He was the winner of the elections held on 7 July of that year, defeating former foreign minister Ezequiel Padilla. He became the first non-military candidate to win the presidency of Mexico, although he was the son of a revolutionary army general. His own skills within the party that brought him the post of Ministry of the Interior played a key role in his selection. There was no violence surrounding the election and the transfer of power took place peacefully.

Presidency 1946-1952

Alemán was inaugurated as President of the Republic on 1 December 1946 and served until 1952, when barred from running from re-election, he returned to civilian life. He was enormously popular prior to his presidency and in his early years as president, but lost support in the waning days of his term.

As president he pushed the program of state-supported industrialization in Mexico and was very friendly toward business. This stance on economic development was a key reason he was tapped to be the party's candidate rather than possible candidates with ideas similar to Cárdenas'. This period of rapid growth and industrialization has been dubbed the Mexican miracle.

Cabinet
Alemán's cabinet were similar in profile to the president himself, relatively young and without military experience, and highly educated, with personal ties to him.  His Secretary of the Interior, Héctor Pérez Martínez; Secretary of Public works, Ángel Carvajal; and Secretary of Labor, both Manuel Ramirez Vázquez and Andrés Serra Rojas had all been part of his close-knit group from the Faculty of Law at UNAM.

Domestic policy

Infrastructure

Alemán directed government spending to state-sponsored industrial development and reduced military spending as had his predecessors. That development included investments in infrastructure, especially public works. Dam-building helped control flooding, expand irrigation, which allowed for the expansion of large-scale agriculture, and provided hydroelectric power.   In 1947 he initiated a huge project in the state of Oaxaca, culminating with the opening of the Miguel Alemán Dam in 1955. In 1951 he oversaw completion of the diversion of the Lerma River, bringing to an end Mexico City's water supply problems.

Extending the nation's rail network, building and improving highways brought remote regions into the national economy. In Mexico City an existing airfield was enlarged and became the Mexico City International Airport.

His administration also built a new campus for the National University (UNAM) in the south of the city, moving it from its previous location in downtown Mexico City.

In 1952 his administration elevated Baja California to state status. Also during his term, he asserted power by forced imposition of state governors.
  
He played a major role in the development and support of the city of Acapulco as an international tourist destination. 
Rampant political corruption and crony capitalism would mark his administration, however, and this would shape the relationship of politics and big business in Mexico until the present day. His successful economic policy led to talk about the Mexican miracle, but only a small elite benefited from economic growth. His administration took an anti-communist stance and supported the US during the Cold War.

Foreign policy

During his administration the close relationship with the US developed during World War II continued, although he refused to send Mexican troops to participate in the Korean War.

In 1947, on the eve of the Cold War, he created the Mexican DFS intelligence agency to support and cooperate with CIA operations in Mexico. Its stated mission was "preserving the internal stability . . . against all forms of subversion".

He negotiated a major loan from the United States in 1947. Alemán and US President Harry S. Truman rode in a parade in Washington that attracted an estimated 600,000 well-wishers. 
Internationally, he signed peace agreements with Japan, Germany and Italy following World War II, had a hand in a truce between Pakistan and India and worked with the US on the issue of braceros.

Election of 1952

In party tradition, Alemán designated his successor as PRI presidential candidate—and the foregone expectation of the next president.  He selected Adolfo Ruiz Cortines, with a reputation for honesty and probity, a sharp contrast to his own record of considerable self-enrichment in office. Before the announcement (destape), there were rumors that Alemán wanted to hold onto power and the a constitutional amendment to allow re-election or extension of his existing term was in the works.  The PRI party founder, Plutarco Elías Calles had remained the power behind the presidency in the six years after president-elect Alvaro Obregón's assassination in 1928. That power void had led to the creation of the Partido Nacional Revolucionario, and Calles called the shots during three the presidencies of Emilio Portes Gil, Pascual Ortiz Rubio, and Abelardo L. Rodríguez. He had expected his control to continue during the presidency of his hand-picked candidate Lázaro Cárdenas.  However, Cárdenas won the power struggle with Calles, exiling him. When Cárdenas's term was nearing its end in 1940, he did continue the tradition of the president choosing his successor and picked the more conservative Manuel Avila Camacho (1940–46).  But in contrast to Calles, Cárdenas stepped away from power, and Avila Camacho was a fully empowered president.  When the rumors of Alemán surfaced about seeking to hold onto power, Cárdenas vigorously objected, so although he did not directly take part in politics, he maintained a level of influence.

Unlike the peaceful change of power in 1946, 1952 was another contested presidential election. Career military officer Miguel Henríquez Guzmán sought to be the candidate of the PRI.  Henriquez was backed by some important politicians, including members of the Cárdenas family, who objected to the rightward turn of the party and the government. Among those who supported Henríquez were the Mexican ambassador to the U.S.; an ex-governor of the important state of Mexico; and a number of military officers. He gathered further support from some students, peasant groups, and discontented workers. According to historian Daniel Cosío Villegas, Alemán was in contact with former President Cárdenas, warning that the Henríquez challenge was a danger to the new system.  Alemán chose Adolfo Ruiz Cortines as the PRI candidate. Once announced in the destape (unveiling of the official candidate), the CTM under the leadership of Fidel Velázquez mobilized their hundreds of thousands of members behind Ruiz. The PRI offered an opening to some Catholics, which was aimed at undermining the candidate for the National Action Party, Efraín González Luna. Marxist politician and labor leader, Vicente Lombardo Toledano ran as well. In the end, the PRI defeated the opposition parties, taking 74.3% of votes cast, but opposition parties on the left and right showed that the PRI was not completely dominant. This election was the last until the election in 2000 with an open PRI campaign prior to president revealing his choice of successor.

Post-presidency
Alemán accumulated a fortune during his lifetime. In his post-presidential years, he directed Mexico's tourism agency and a significant figure in the ownership of Mexican media, including the large television channel Televisa. In politics, he was the leader of the right wing of the PRI. In 1961, he was named the president of the national tourist commission, and was influential in bringing the 1968 Summer Olympics to Mexico. In addition, he was the first president of the Mr. Amigo Association in 1964, which celebrates the bi-national friendliness between the United States and Mexico in the Charro Days and Sombrero Festival celebrations held in Matamoros, Tamaulipas and Brownsville, Texas.   In 1987, his memoirs, entitled Remembranzas y testimonios, were published.

His son Miguel Alemán Velasco is the CEO of Grupo Alemán (Galem), which included Interjet.

See also

Institutional Revolutionary Party
List of heads of state of Mexico
Mexican Miracle

Further reading

Alemán Valdés, Miguel. Remembranzas y testimonios. Mexico City: Grijalbo 1987.
Alexander, Ryan M. Sons of the Mexican Revolution: Miguel Alemán and His Generation. Albuquerque: University of New Mexico Press 2016.
Bernal Tavares, Luis. Vicente Lombardo Toledano y Miguel Alemán: Una bifurcación en la Revolución mexicana. Mexico City: UNAM 1994.
Camp, Roderic Ai. "Education and Political Recruitment in Mexico: The Alemán Generation," Journal of Interamerican Studies and World Affairs 18 no. 3 (Aug. 1976): 295–321.
Camp, Roderic Ai. "Miguel Alemán Valdés" in Mexican Political Biographies, 1935-1981 Second edition. Tucson, Arizona: University of Arizona, 1982. 
Camp, Roderic Ai. "Education and political recruitment in México: the Alemán generation." Journal of Interamerican Studies and World Affairs 18.3 (1976): 295–321.
Camp, Roderic Ai. "The Revolution’s Second Generation: The Miracle, 1946-1982 and Collapse of the PRI, 1982-2000.”." A Companion to Mexican History and Culture (2011): 468-479.
Gil, Jorge, Samuel Schmidt, and Jorge Castro. "La red de poder mexicana. El caso de Miguel Alemán." Revista Mexicana de Sociología (1993): 103–117.
Krauze, Enrique, Mexico: Biography of Power. New York: HarperCollins 1997. 
Medin, Tzvi. El sexenio alemanista. Ideologíaí y praxis política de Miguel Alemán. Mexico City: Edicisiones Era 1990.
Sanchez, Mario Raul Mijares. Mexico: the Genesis of Its Political Decomposition:(Miguel Alemán Valdés: 1936 to 1952). Palibrio, 2013.
Torres, Blanca. Historia de la Revolución Mexicana, 1940-1952: Hacia la utopia industrial. Mexico City: El Colegio de México 1979.
Wise, George S. El México de Alemán. (1952)

References

 Mexican government biography

External links

 Mexican government biography

|-

|-

|-

Presidents of Mexico

Mexican people of Asturian descent
Mexican Secretaries of the Interior
Governors of Veracruz
Institutional Revolutionary Party politicians
National Autonomous University of Mexico alumni
Politicians from Veracruz
1900 births
1983 deaths
20th-century Mexican politicians
Miguel Aleman Valdes
Interjet
Mexican anti-communists